Coleophora hermanniella is a moth of the family Coleophoridae. It is found on Corsica.

The larvae feed on Anthyllis hermanniae. They feed on the generative organs of their host plant.

References

hermanniella
Moths described in 1898
Moths of Europe